Agharabparast Expressway is an expressway in southern Isfahan, Iran. It connects Shahrekord Expressway to Shiraz Expressway.

Streets in Isfahan